The  ("Imperial Eagle") is the heraldic eagle, derived from the Roman eagle standard, used by the Holy Roman Emperors and in modern coats of arms of Germany, including those of the Second German Empire (1871–1918), the Weimar Republic (1919–1933) and Nazi Germany (1933–1945). 

The same design has remained in use by the Federal Republic of Germany since 1945, albeit under the name  ("Federal Eagle").

History

Holy Roman Empire

The Reichsadler, i. e. the German Imperial Eagle, originated from a proto-heraldic emblem that was believed to have been used by Charlemagne, the first Frankish ruler whom the Pope crowned as Holy Roman Emperor in AD 800, and derived ultimately from the Aquila, i. e. eagle standard, of the ancient Roman army. 

An eagle statue was erected on the roof of the Carolingian palace, and an eagle was placed on the orb of Emperor Otto III. Emperor Frederick Barbarossa popularised use of the eagle as the Imperial emblem by using it in all his banners, coats of arms, coins, and insignia.

The Ottonian and Salian Emperors had themselves depicted with the Roman "eagle sceptre", and Emperor Frederick II depicted the Imperial Eagle on his coins. Before the mid-13th century, however, the Imperial Eagle was an Imperial symbol in its own right, and not used yet as a heraldic charge in a coat of arms.

An early depiction of a double-headed Imperial Eagle in a heraldic shield, attributed to Frederick II of Hohenstaufen, is found in the Chronica Majora by Matthew Paris (circa 1250). Segar's Roll (circa 1280) likewise depicts the double-headed Imperial Eagle as the coat of arms of the King of Germany.

The Imperial Eagle also is depicted in the seals of free Imperial cities, including that of Kaiserswerth in the 13th century, Lübeck in the 14th century, Besançon, Cheb, and others.

Use of the Imperial Eagle in the Imperial coat of arms of a reigning emperor dates to after the interregnum. Sigismund of Luxembourg used a black double-headed Imperial Eagle after he was crowned as Holy Roman Emperor in 1433; thereafter the single-headed Imperial Eagle represented the title of King of the Romans and the double-headed one the title of Emperor. During the following century, Albert II of Germany was the final King-Elect of Germany who did not progress to coronation as Emperor. After the German Reformation, beginning with Ferdinand I (1558), the Holy Roman Emperors ceased to be crowned by the Pope.

The Teutonic Order under Hermann von Salza had the privilege of displaying the Imperial Eagle in its coat of arms, which privilege Emperor Frederick II granted it. The black Imperial Eagle was later adopted when the Teutonic State was transformed into the Duchy of Prussia in 1525, and a modified version was used in the arms of Royal Prussia (1466–1772).

Modern use
In 1804, Holy Roman Emperor Francis II established the Austrian Empire from the lands of the Habsburg monarchy, and adopted the double-headed eagle, aggrandized by an inescutcheon emblem of the House of Habsburg-Lorraine and the Order of the Golden Fleece, as its coat of arms; the Holy Roman Empire was subsequently dissolved in 1806. Since 1919 the coat of arms of Austria has depicted a single-headed eagle. Although not a national symbol in the modern sense, the  evoked sentiments of loyalty to the empire.

It was once again restored in 1871 when a single-headed eagle with a Prussian inescutcheon became the insignia of the German Empire; the single head was used to represent the so-called , i.e. it excluded Austria.

During Nazi rule, a stylised eagle combined with the Nazi swastika was made the national emblem by order of Adolf Hitler in 1935. Despite its medieval origin, the term "" in common English understanding is mostly associated with this specific Nazi-era version. These two insignia can be distinguished as the  looks to its right shoulder whereas the  looks to its left shoulder.

After World War II the Federal Republic of Germany re-implemented the eagle used by the Weimar Republic by enactment of President Theodor Heuss in 1950.

Gallery

Holy Roman Empire

Modern history

See also
 Armorial of the Holy Roman Empire
 Quaternion Eagle
 Imperial Eagle beaker
 Aquila (Roman)
 Byzantine heraldry
 Coat of arms of Austria
 Coat of arms of Brandenburg
 Coat of arms of Germany
 Coat of arms of Prussia
 Coat of arms of Russia
 Double-headed eagle
 Coat of arms of Bogotá

References

Norbert Weyss: "Der Doppeladler – Geschichte eines Symbols", Adler 3, 1986, 78ff.
Franz Gall: "Zur Entwicklung des Doppeladlers auf den kaiserlichen Siegeln", Adler 8 (1970), 281ff.
 Vladimir Monakhov: Новые-старые цвета России, или Как возвращали орла, ГЕРАЛЬДИКА СЕГОДНЯ (2003).
 Michael Göbl, "Staatssymbole des Habsburger-Reiches - ab 1867 mit besonderer Berücksichtigung des Staatswappens", in: Österreichs politische Symbole (1994), 11ff.

External links

 P. Diem, Die Entwicklung des österreichischen Doppeladlers 

Imperial Eagle
Heraldry of the Holy Roman Empire
National symbols of Germany
Fascist symbols
Nazi symbolism
Symbols of Nazi Germany